The 2022 Barnsley Metropolitan Borough Council election took place on 5 May 2022. One third of councillors — 21 out of 63 — were elected. The election took place alongside the 2022 South Yorkshire mayoral election and other local elections across the United Kingdom.

In the previous council election in 2021, Labour maintained its longstanding control of the council, holding 49 seats after the election. The Liberal Democrats formed the main opposition with seven seats, with the Conservatives on three, independents and the Democrats and Veterans Party having two each and a single Barnsley Independent Group councillor.

Background 

The Local Government Act 1972 created a two-tier system of metropolitan counties and districts covering Greater Manchester, Merseyside, South Yorkshire, Tyne and Wear, the West Midlands, and West Yorkshire starting in 1974. Barnsley was a district of the South Yorkshire metropolitan county. The Local Government Act 1985 abolished the metropolitan counties, with metropolitan districts taking on most of their powers as metropolitan boroughs. The South Yorkshire Combined Authority was established in 2014 as the Sheffield City Region Combined Authority, which began electing the mayor of South Yorkshire in 2018.

Since its formation, Barnsley has continuously been under Labour control. Councillors have predominantly been elected from the Labour Party, various independents, the Conservative Party and the Liberal Democrats. The council elected a large number of Barnsley Independent Group councillors in the 2006 election, whose numbers have been falling since. Councillors who will be seeking re-election will have been most recently elected in the 2018 election, in order to complete a four-year term. In that election, 19 Labour councillors were election alongside one Conservative councillor and one Liberal Democrat councillor. In the most recent election in 2021, seventeen Labour councillors were elected with 40.4% of the vote across the borough, with three Liberal Democrats on 11.8% of the vote across the borough and one Conservative with 25.1% of the vote across the borough. Labour held the Rockingham ward after a coin toss broke a tie between the Labour candidate and the Conservative candidate. After that election, the council had 49 Labour councillors, seven Liberal Democrats, three Conservatives, two independents, two Democrats and Veterans and one Barnsley Independent Group councillor. The councillor Trevor Smith joined the Labour Party after his previous Democrats and Veterans Party was dissolved. 

The positions up for election in 2022 were last elected in 2018, when Labour won 19 seats and the Conservatives and Liberal Democrats won one each.

Electoral process 

The council elects its councillors in thirds, with a third being up for election every year for three years, with no election in the fourth year. The election will take place by first-past-the-post voting, with wards generally being represented by three councillors, with one elected in each election year to serve a four-year term.

All registered electors (British, Irish, Commonwealth and European Union citizens) living in Barnsley aged 18 or over will be entitled to vote in the election. People who live at two addresses in different councils, such as university students with different term-time and holiday addresses, are entitled to be registered for and vote in elections in both local authorities. Voting in-person at polling stations will take place from 07:00 to 22:00 on election day, and voters will be able to apply for postal votes or proxy votes in advance of the election.

Previous council composition

Results summary

Ward results

Central

Cudworth

Darfield

Darton East

Darton West

Dearne North

Dearne South

Dodworth

Hoyland Milton

Kingstone

Monk Bretton

North East

Old Town

Penistone East

Penistone West

Rockingham

Royston

St Helen's

Stairfoot

Wombwell

Worsbrough

References 

Barnsley Council elections
Barnsley